The 2017 IIFA Awards, officially known as the 18th International Indian Film Academy Awards ceremony, presented by the International Indian Film Academy honouring the best Hindi films of 2016, occurred in MetLife Stadium in East Rutherford, New Jersey on 14–15 July 2017. It was the first time that the awards held there and also IIFA returned to United States after 2014.

Ae Dil Hai Mushkil led the ceremony with 8 nominations, followed by M.S. Dhoni: The Untold Story, Pink and Udta Punjab with 7 nominations each.

Ae Dil Hai Mushkil won 7 awards, including Best Music Director (for Pritam), Best Lyricist (for Amitabh Bhattacharya – "Channa Mereya") and Best Male Playback Singer (for Amit Mishra – "Bulleya"), thus becoming the most-awarded film at the ceremony.

Alia Bhatt received dual nominations for Best Actress for her performances in Dear Zindagi and Udta Punjab, winning for the latter.

Winners and Nominees
Winners are listed first and highlighted in boldface.

`

Musical awards

Technical awards

Special Awards

References

External links
 

IIfa Awards

IIFA awards